Love Pt. 2: Passion is the fifth extended play by South Korean boy group WEi. It was released by Oui Entertainment on October 19, 2022 and contains six tracks, including the lead single "Spray".

Background and release 
On October 6, 2022, it was announced the group would release their fifth extended play Love Pt. 2: Passion on October 19. On March 8, the track list was released, with "Spray" announced as the lead single. On October 14, the highlight medley video was released. Music video teasers for the lead single were released on October 17 and October 18, respectively.

Composition 
Love Pt. 2: Passion consists of six tracks and is described as expressing love with passion and confidence while depicting the growing pains of love experienced by youth. The opening track "Moonlight" is a love song that expresses a love felt under a night sky. The lead single "Spray" is a song that declares you will be covered with their colors as if drawing graffiti on a canvas. The third track "Higher Ground" is a song which captures the passion of love. The fourth track "Rose" is a song that expresses the feelings of falling in love with one's charms that resemble a rose. The fifth track "Special Holiday" is a song which compares every day of life with someone you love to a special holiday. The sixth track "Umbrella" is a song which promises to always be by your side.

Promotion 
Following the release of Love Pt. 2: Passion, WEi held a media showcase and a fan showcase on the same date to introduce the extended play and communicate with their fans. The group performed "Spray", "Higher Ground", and "Moonlight" during the showcase. The group's promotions for the song "Spray" began on October 20, 2022, on Mnet's M Countdown.

Track listing

Charts

Weekly charts

Monthly charts

Year-end charts

Release history

References 

2022 EPs
Korean-language EPs
K-pop EPs